North South University (also known as NSU) is a private university based in Dhaka,  Bangladesh. Its business school is the first Bangladeshi university to receive American accreditation from the ACBSP in 2015.

Campus
The university's campus is located at Bashundhara Residential Area in Dhaka. It is one of the largest private universities in Bangladesh, in terms of student population. The foundation of the campus was laid on 30 January 2003 by Begum Khaleda Zia. Classes started in the permanent campus from 9 June 2009.

This campus can serve up to 12,000 students with amenities and facilities. It contains six buildings with three basements on seven acres of land having 1,250,000 square feet of floorspace.

Administration 
There is a separate admin building dedicated for administration activities.

List of vice-chancellors
 Muslehuddin Ahmad
 Hafiz Siddiqi (3 January 2003 – 2010)
 Amin U. Sarkar (June 2013- August 2015)
 Atique Islam (2016–present)

Library

The NSU library has over  floor area on the southeastern side of the campus. It is the first fully automated university library in Bangladesh using its own library management software, which supports RFID system, web-based online circulation system, full-text e-books and online journal article repository services. The library can accommodate over 1,200 students in its reading rooms. On average 2,000 students use the library every day.

As of August 2014, the library holds 49,500 books, 50,000 online books, 6,000 bound journals (Foreign and local) and magazines, 1,890 CD-ROM databases and books, 226 DVD and videos, 159 audio-cassettes, and other resources.

Academic departments
The university's ten departments are organized into four schools.

School of Business and Economics (SBE)
The School of Business and Economics (SBE) at North South University is accredited by the Accreditation Council for Business Schools and Programs (ACBSP). It is the first Business school in Bangladesh to receive American accreditation. SBE of NSU secured the Global Rank of 401–450 in Business and Management Studies in the QS World University Rankings 2020. The School of Business and Economics (SBE) consists of four departments.
 Department of Accounting & Finance
 Department of Economics
 Department of Management
 Department of Marketing & International Business

School of Engineering & Physical Sciences(SEPS)
The School of Engineering & Physical Sciences (SEPS) intends to be a center of excellence in innovation and technological entrepreneurship by building a knowledge and skill based learning environment for students in the field of engineering, architecture and physical sciences with adequate technical competency, social responsibility, communication skill and ethical standard.
The Department of Electrical and Computer Engineering have three majors in undergraduate programs.
 Department of Architecture
 Department of Civil and Environmental Engineering
 Department of Electrical and Computer Engineering 
 Bachelor of Science in Computer Science and Engineering (BSCSE) 
 Bachelor of Science in Electrical and Electronic Engineering (BSEEE)
 Bachelor of Science in Electronics and Telecommunication Engineering (BSETE)

School of Humanities & Social Sciences
 Department of English & Modern Languages
 Department of History & Philosophy
 Department of Law
 Department of Political Science & Sociology

School of Health & Life Sciences
 Department of Biochemistry & Microbiology
 Department of Environmental Science and Management
 Department of Pharmaceutical Sciences
 Department of Public Health

Institutes
NSU has four institutes and four centers.

Institute of Development, Environment and Strategic Studies (IDESS)
The Institute of Development, Environment and Strategic Studies (IDESS) is a research center.

NSU Global Health Institute (NGHI)
The NSU Global Health Institute (NGHI) at NSU was established  NGHI for discovery and competency development of human welfare aiming to build strengthen the emerging field of global health response and leadership.

NSU Genome Research Institute (NGRI)
The NSU Genome Research Institute (NGRI) at NSU was established on 14 May 2017, for discovery and competency development of human welfare aiming to build strengthen the emerging field of genomic research field leadership, which is the first genomic research institute in Bangladesh

Confucius Institute
The Confucius Institute at NSU was established in February 2006, the only language institute in Bangladesh which offers Chinese-language only education.

Student Counselling Center (SCC)
The North South University-Student Counseling Center (NSU-SCC) is a support system for the students of the University and addresses their emotional well-being. It serves as a primary mental health care unit, and as such it offers taking therapy and advice for further referrals. It has no jurisdiction over the academic and administrative affairs of the University.

Career and Placement Center (CPC)
The Career and Placement Center (CPC) is a comprehensive career management support platform for NSU students.

Center for Infrastructure Research and Services (CIRS)
Center for Infrastructure Research and Services (CIRS, NSU) can offer access to the University’s state-of-the-art laboratory equipment and facilities to companies of all sizes for a wide range of testing and analysis services. The services which it offers reflect the breadth and depth of the University’s research capabilities, from independent testing services to collaborative prototype generation. The center has expert technicians, servicemen, and staff under the direct supervision of faculty members to carry out the tests and analysis. CIRS undertakes research, testing, and consultation work in the field of engineering, construction management, and environmental issues as required by the private, government, or autonomous bodies.

NSU Center for Business Research (NSU CBR)
There is a strong need at the NSU business research community for a platform focusing on building, storing, investigating, analyzing, and learning through research activities on business and economic phenomena in Bangladesh and the world.  Based on these overarching needs, a new Center for Business Research was established.

Publications
The university publishes a journal called Panini.

Ranking

The North South University ranked 301–500 in the "Graduate Employability Ranking 2020"
published by the higher education information service provider Quacquarelli Symonds (QS). The ranking indicates how well students from a university can gain a foothold on the global job market. In 2019, NSU was amongst the top 2 in Bangladesh, and one of the top 500 universities on an international scale. The university ranked 301–350 in the "Asian University Rankings"  published by QS World University Rankings. It is also ranked 1st among the private universities and 4th among all the universities in research output on the Bangladesh University Ranking 2019.
The department of electrical and computer engineering of NSU ranked 551–600 in the QS World University Rankings 2020 in "Computer Science and Information Systems (CSIS)". NSU has proudly alleviated its position to the range of 291–300, and is the only private University in Bangladesh to be featured in the Top 300 and thereby, becoming the best private university in the country.

Notable people

Faculty
 Syed Alamgir, businessman

Alumni
 Mashiat Rahman, actress

Controversies
 Corruption allegation: In 2012, University Grants Commission found some instances of corruption of the university trustee board's chairman. So, the education ministry dissolved the trustee board. One of the trustee members was charged with corruption.
 Former students involved in militancy: In 2016, some former students of NSU and faculty members were found to have links with militant activities. Some of them were involved in violent armed assault.
Investigators found printed materials published by militant groups in a library.
UGC had suggested measures to curb the involvement by student attendance tracking, online monitoring by guardians and student participation in social activities.

Gallery

References

Further reading
 

 
Private universities in Bangladesh
Educational institutions established in 1992
Architecture in Bangladesh
Architecture schools in Bangladesh
Universities and colleges in Dhaka
1992 establishments in Bangladesh